Brooklands may refer to:

Places

Australia
Brooklands, Queensland, a locality in the South Burnett Region, Queensland

England
Brooklands, a former motor racing circuit and aerodrome in Surrey
Brooklands, Greater Manchester
Brooklands (Manchester ward), electoral ward of Manchester City Council
Brooklands (Trafford ward), electoral ward of Trafford Metropolitan Borough Council
 Brooklands, a district in the civil parish of Broughton in Milton Keynes

New Zealand
Brooklands, New Plymouth, a suburb of New Plymouth in Taranaki
Brooklands, Nelson, a suburb of Nelson
Brooklands, Christchurch, a settlement north-east of Christchurch, close to the mouth of the Waimakariri River
Brooklands, Otago, a farming locality near Milton, in Otago

United States
 Brooklands, now Brooklands Park in Suffern, New York. Home of Daniel Carter Beard, a founder of Boy Scouts of America.

Others
The Bentley Brooklands motor car, named after the racing circuit
The limited edition Ford Capri 280, nicknamed "Brooklands", referring to the name of the shade of green that all Capri 280 models were painted in